White Eagle is a 1922 American silent Western film serial directed by Fred Jackman and W. S. Van Dyke. The film is considered to be lost. White Eagle is almost a remake of the earlier Ruth Roland serial Hands Up  The serial features a famous scene of Ruth Roland climbing a rope ladder from a moving train to a plane flying overhead.

Cast
 Ruth Roland as Ruth Randolph
 Earl Metcalfe as Phil Stanton
 Harry Girard as Jim Loomis
 Virginia Ainsworth as Julia Wells
 Otto Lederer as Gray Wolf
 Bud Osborne as Standing Bear
 Frank Lackteen as Crouching Mole
 Gertrude Douglas as Moonlight
 Louise Emmons as Stone Ear
 Frank Valrose as Feather Foot
 Chick Morrison as Bill Henley
 Anita Nara

Episodes
The serial consisted of fifteen two reel episodes, two of which were entitled "The Clash of the Clans."

 The Sign of the Trident
 The Red Men's Menace
 A Strange Message
 The Lost Trail
 The Clash of the Clans
 The Trap
 The Mysterious Voyage
 The Island of Terror
 The Flaming Arrow
 The Cave of Peril
 Danger Rails
 Win or Lose
 The Clash of the Clans
 The Pivoted Rock
 The Golden Pool

See also
 List of film serials
 List of film serials by studio

References

External links
 

1922 films
1922 Western (genre) films
1922 lost films
American silent serial films
American black-and-white films
Lost Western (genre) films
Films directed by Fred Jackman
Films directed by W. S. Van Dyke
Lost American films
Silent American Western (genre) films
1920s American films